The Universal Broadcast is the first live CD and DVD from the Newcastle-based English Christian Rock band YFriday. Released in March 2008, it features songs from most of the band's albums and one song not yet recorded in the studio (How Can We Dance?) and a bonus 'Behind The Scenes' DVD feature.

Published on the 'Survivor Music' label, the CD and DVD were recorded at the same concert. Over 1,300 fans came to the Riverside Centre in Derby on 27 October 2007 where the recording was made.

Track listing
 Intro (2001: A Space Odyssey - Sprach Zarathustra) (1:49)
 Universal (3:38) 
 Someone I Can Live For (3:07)
 Wonderful (3:41)
 I'm Yours (5:19)
 Hands Up (4:28)
 Holy Holy Holy (4:01)
 How Can We Dance? (5:33)
 Shine2 (3:33)
 Rise (3:22)
 Start of the Summer/Rain (6:25)
 Gravity (6:34)
 Everlasting God (7:30)
 One Hope (4:26)
 Revolution (5:49)

Personnel
 Ken Riley - Vocals & Guitars
 Gav Richards - Keyboards, Guitars & Backing Vocals
 Danny Smith - Bass & Backing Vocals
 Dez Minto - Drums
 Subrina McCalla - Additional Vocals in Hands Up
 Crystal Jones -  Additional Vocals in Hands Up

External links 
The Universal Broadcast: Live CD review

YFriday albums
2008 live albums
Survivor Records live albums